Teresa Quesada is a Peruvian pianist. She was a student of Rudolf Serkin at the Curtis Institute of Music and of Gyorgy Sandor at Indiana University. She performed Tchaikovsky's Piano Concerto No. 1 under Eugene Ormandy with the Philadelphia Orchestra and later became an influential teacher at the National Conservatory of Music in Lima.

References

External links
 Article (in Spanish) about a concert tribute to Quesada

Peruvian pianists
Living people
Year of birth missing (living people)
Place of birth missing (living people)
21st-century pianists